Coylumbridge  (Scottish Gaelic Drochaid na Cuingleum) is a small rural newly built hamlet), that lies 6 miles northeast of Dalnavert, Highland, and  3 miles southeast of Aviemore, in the valley of the River Spey, in the west Cairngorms National Park,  in Badenoch and Strathspey, Inverness-shire, Scottish Highlands and is in the Scottish council area of Highland.

The single track B970 B road which connects Kingussie to Inverdruie passes Coylumbridge.

References

Populated places in Badenoch and Strathspey